Quinoline is a heterocyclic aromatic organic compound with the chemical formula C9H7N.  It is a colorless hygroscopic liquid with a strong odor. Aged samples, especially if exposed to light, become yellow and later brown.  Quinoline is only slightly soluble in cold water but dissolves readily in hot water and most organic solvents.  Quinoline itself has few applications, but many of its  derivatives are useful in diverse applications.  A prominent example is quinine, an alkaloid found in plants. Over 200 biologically active quinoline and quinazoline alkaloids are identified. 4-Hydroxy-2-alkylquinolines (HAQs) are involved in antibiotic resistance.

Occurrence and isolation 
Quinoline was first extracted from coal tar in 1834 by German chemist Friedlieb Ferdinand Runge; he called quinoline leukol ("white oil" in Greek). Coal tar remains the principal source of commercial quinoline.  In 1842, French chemist Charles Gerhardt obtained a compound by dry distilling quinine, strychnine, or cinchonine with potassium hydroxide; he called the compound Chinoilin or Chinolein.  Runge's and Gephardt's compounds seemed to be distinct isomers because they reacted differently. However, the German chemist August Hoffmann eventually recognized that the differences in behaviors was due to the presence of contaminants and that the two compounds were actually identical. The only report of quinoline as a natural product is from the Peruvian stick insect
Oreophoetes peruana. They have a pair of thoracic glands from which they discharge a malodorous fluid containing quinoline when disturbed.

Like other nitrogen heterocyclic compounds, such as pyridine derivatives, quinoline is often reported as an environmental contaminant associated with facilities processing oil shale or coal, and has also been found at legacy wood treatment sites. Owing to its relatively high solubility in water quinoline has significant potential for mobility in the environment, which may promote water contamination. Quinoline is readily degradable by certain microorganisms, such as Rhodococcus species Strain Q1, which was isolated from soil and paper mill sludge.

Quinolines are present in small amounts in crude oil within the virgin diesel fraction. It can be removed by the process called hydrodenitrification.

Synthesis 
Quinolines are often synthesized from simple anilines using a number of named reactions.

Going clockwise from top these are: 
 Combes quinoline synthesis using anilines and β-diketones.
 Conrad-Limpach synthesis using anilines and β-ketoesters.
 Doebner reaction using anilines with an aldehyde and pyruvic acid to form quinoline-4-carboxylic acids
 Doebner-Miller reaction using anilines and α,β-unsaturated carbonyl compounds.
 Gould-Jacobs reaction starting from an aniline and ethyl ethoxymethylenemalonate
 Skraup synthesis using ferrous sulfate, glycerol, aniline, nitrobenzene, and sulfuric acid.

A number of other processes exist, which require specifically substituted anilines or related compounds:
 Camps quinoline synthesis using an o-acylaminoacetophenone and hydroxide
 Friedländer synthesis using 2-aminobenzaldehyde and acetaldehyde
 Knorr quinoline synthesis, using a  β-ketoanilide and sulfuric acid
 Niementowski quinoline synthesis, using anthranilic acid and ketones
 Pfitzinger reaction using an isatin with base and a carbonyl compound to yield substituted quinoline-4-carboxylic acids
 Povarov reaction using an aniline, a benzaldehyde and an activated alkene

Applications 
Quinoline is used in the manufacture of dyes, the preparation of hydroxyquinoline sulfate and niacin. It is also used as a solvent for resins and terpenes.

Quinoline is mainly used as in the production of other specialty chemicals.  Approximately 4 tonnes are produced annually according to a report published in 2005.  Its principal use is as a precursor to 8-hydroxyquinoline, which is a versatile chelating agent and precursor to pesticides.  Its 2- and 4-methyl derivatives are precursors to cyanine dyes.  Oxidation of quinoline affords quinolinic acid (pyridine-2,3-dicarboxylic acid), a precursor to the herbicide sold under the name "Assert".

The reduction of quinoline with sodium borohydride in the presence of acetic acid is known to produce Kairoline A. (C.f. Kairine)

Quinoline has several anti-malarial derivatives, including quinine, chloroquine, amodiaquine, and primaquine.

Quinolines are reduced to tetrahydroquinolines enantioselectively using several catalyst systems.

Quinolinium compounds (e.g. salts) can also be used as corrosion inhibitors and intensifiers.

See also 
 Quinoline alkaloids
 4-Aminoquinoline
 8-Hydroxyquinoline
 Pyrroloquinoline quinone (PQQ), a redox cofactor and controversial nutritional supplement
 Quinazoline, an aza derivative of quinoline
 Quinine

 Similar simple aromatic rings
 Isoquinoline, an analog with the nitrogen atom in position 2
 Pyridine, an analog without the fused benzene ring
 Naphthalene, an analog with a carbon instead of the nitrogen
 Indole, an analog with only a five-membered nitrogen ring

References

External links

New methods of synthesizing quinolines

 
Amine solvents
Simple aromatic rings
Foul-smelling chemicals